Ushaka is a 1977 album by the South African isicathamiya group Ladysmith Black Mambazo. The members who sang in the Ushaka album were Ben Shabalala Jockey Shabalala Patrick Zondo Jabulani Dubazana Fikile Groonwell Khumalo Funokwakhe Mazibuko Milton Mazibuko Albert Mazibuko Joseph Shabalala

Track listing
 "Ushaka"
 "Awuilikeweiner Wemadoda"
 "Hamba Nhliziyo Yam"
 "Intombi Mayiqoma"
 "Ukuthula Zinsizwa"
 "Lomhlaba Kawunoni"
 "Ayilwanga"
 "Zehla Entabeni"
 "Ikhaya Lagangcwele"
 "Yangiluma Inkukhu"
 "Ngeke Ngiphinde"
 "Iya Bhompa"

1977 albums
Ladysmith Black Mambazo albums